Ochyrocera laracna is a species of spiders of the family Ochyroceratidae. It is endemic to Brazil. It was named after Shelob (Laracna in Portuguese), giant spider from J.R.R. Tolkien's The Lord of the Rings.

See also
 List of Ochyroceratidae species
 List of things named after J. R. R. Tolkien and his works

References

Ochyroceratidae
Spiders of Brazil
Endemic fauna of Brazil
Spiders described in 2018
Organisms named after Tolkien and his works